Robert Ewing Thomason known as R. Ewing Thomason (May 30, 1879 – November 8, 1973) was a Texas politician, a member and Speaker of the Texas House of Representatives, the mayor of El Paso, a Democratic member of the United States House of Representatives, and a United States district judge of the United States District Court for the Western District of Texas.

Early life and education

Born in Shelbyville, Bedford County, Tennessee, Thomason moved to Gainesville, Texas, with his parents in 1880. He attended public schools, and received a Bachelor of Science degree from Southwestern University in Georgetown, Texas, in 1898. Thomason received a Bachelor of Laws from the University of Texas School of Law in 1900 and was admitted to the bar in 1901, commencing practice in Gainesville. Thomason was the prosecuting attorney of Cooke County, Texas, from 1902 to 1906.

Professional career

Thomason continued to practice law upon his moving to El Paso, in a law firm with Thomas Calloway Lea, Jr., and later J. G. McGrady and Eugene T. Edwards. He was a member of the Texas House of Representatives from 1917 to 1921, serving as Speaker in 1920 and 1921. Thomason served as the Mayor of El Paso from 1927 to 1930, and was elected to the 72nd United States Congress as a Democrat in 1930. Thomason served from March 4, 1931 until his resignation on July 31, 1947, to take a seat on the federal bench.

Federal judicial service

Thomason was nominated by President Harry S. Truman on April 24, 1947, to a seat on the United States District Court for the Western District of Texas vacated by Judge Charles Albert Boynton. He was confirmed by the United States Senate on June 3, 1947, and received his commission on June 5, 1947. He assumed senior status on June 1, 1963. He served in senior status in El Paso until his death there on November 8, 1973. He was interred in Restlawn Cemetery in El Paso.

Honor

El Paso County Hospital District's University Medical Center, was named in his honor from 1963 until 2009. In 2016 the United States courthouse in El Paso was renamed in his honor.

Fraternity
Robert E. Thomason was a freemason and belonged to El Paso Lodge # 130 A.F. & A.M. He also belonged to El Maida Shrine and served as Illustrious Potentate.

References

Sources

External links
 
 R. E. Thomason Shaped City, State, Nation - El Paso Community College Borderlands project
 El Paso County, Texas - Political Graveyard

1879 births
1973 deaths
People from Shelbyville, Tennessee
Judges of the United States District Court for the Western District of Texas
United States district court judges appointed by Harry S. Truman
20th-century American judges
Mayors of El Paso, Texas
Speakers of the Texas House of Representatives
Texas lawyers
Democratic Party members of the United States House of Representatives from Texas